Tsen Huai-Kuang (born 1934) is a male former international table tennis player from China.

Table tennis career
He won a bronze medal at the 1956 World Table Tennis Championships in the Swaythling Cup (men's team event) with Hu Ping-chuan, Chiang Yung-Ning, Wang Chuanyao and Yang Jai-Hua for China.

See also
 List of table tennis players
 List of World Table Tennis Championships medalists

References

Chinese male table tennis players
Table tennis players from Guangdong
1934 births
Living people
World Table Tennis Championships medalists